Gowa (Makassar language) is a regency in the province of South Sulawesi, Indonesia. It has an area of 1,883.33 km2 and a population of 652,329 at the 2010 census, increasing to 765,836 at the 2020 census; the official estimate as at mid 2021 was 773,315. The majority of the regency (the western eleven districts, with 617,277 inhabitants, or 79.8% of the regency's population in 2021) lies within the official metropolitan area of the city of Makassar, including the regency's administrative capital at Sungguminasa. The hill resort of Malino is within the eastern (non-metropolitan) part of the regency.

History

Geography

Gowa is located at 12°38.16'E Longitude of Jakarta and 5°33.6'E longitude of the North Pole. While the location of the region his administration between, 12°33.19 'to 13°15:17'E longitude and 5°5' to 5°34.7'S latitude of Jakarta.

The regency is located in the southern part of South Sulawesi province, and is bordered to the north by the city of Makassar and Maros Regency, to the east by Sinjai Regency, Bulukumba Regency and Bantaeng, to the south by Takalar and Jeneponto Regencies, and to the west by the city of Makassar and Takalar Regency.

The total area is 1,883.33 km2, equal to 3.01% of the area of South Sulawesi province. Gowa regency is divided into eighteen districts, comprising 167 villages and 726 hamlets.

The Bili-Bili Dam, located about 30 km from Makassar, was completed in 1998.

Administrative districts 
The regency is divided into eighteen districts (kecamatan), tabulated below with their areas and their populations at the 2010 census and 2020 census, and according to the official estimates for mid 2021. The table also includes the locations of the district administrative centres, the number of administrative villages (rural desa and urban kelurahan) in each district, and its post code.

The first eleven of the eighteen districts tabulated above lie within the official metropolitan area of the city of Makassar; the remaining seven districts lie outside that area.

Economy

Mining

Mineral deposits, group C along the Watershed (DAS) Jenebarang, such as sand, stone and gravel hereditary able to provide for the surrounding population. The contribution of this sector in economic activity in 2000 amounting to Rp.105,4 billion, or 9.13 percent, but the contribution of this sector to the regency government's treasury is significant.

In fiscal year 2001, the district government is targeting Rp. 2.03 billion of tax excavated material to fill a class C revenue (PAD). Quarrying activities is quite large because in addition to the availability of material from the DAS, there is also a mountain stone and clay. The trucks are passing transporting this material along protocol roads connecting with Gowa Makassar.

Excavated material is capable of providing for cash receipts, Gowa regency. Pos dominates income tax up to 65 percent in the 2001 fiscal year revenue in the amount of Rp. 3.11 billion.

Agriculture

Gowa real potential is agriculture. The main job of the regencies in 2000 per capita income of Rp. 2.09 million are farming, with food crops sub-sector as the mainstay. The agricultural sector contributed 45 percent or Rp. 515.2 billion. Paddy fields were less than 20 percent (3,640 hectares) of the total land area of the regency is able to provide sufficient results. Production of various agricultural crops such as rice and other crops, horticultural crops to be excellent.

Sub-districts in the highlands like Parangloe, Bungaya and especially Tinggimoncong a vegetable producing center. The most widely cultivated vegetables are potatoes, cabbage, mustard, onion and beans. Per year, the harvest of vegetables exceed 5,000 tons. Vegetables of Gowa Makassar city is able to meet the market and its surroundings, even to the island of Borneo and the Maluku through the port of Pare Pare and Port Mamuju.

In addition to farming vegetables that have a short growing season, farmers Gowa also many who farm crops longevity. One of them is the passion fruit plants (Fassifora sp). Visited Makassar less afdol feel if not bring fruit or juice passion fruit syrup hands. If we look at the views of the airport or the port, most of the passengers who will leave Makassar bring this fresh flavorful juice. Plants from the mainland of South America is synonymous with South Sulawesi. Kanreapia Village, District Tinggimoncong is one of passion fruit producing areas in Gowa. Unfortunately, passion fruit sour taste of the fruit is sweet and capable of moving a small food and beverage industry is now beginning farmers less desirable. Planting of passion is not easy, except for the long cropping period and require special care, such as high surface soil, fertilizers and drugs are quite expensive.

Furthermore, the price of passion fruit is also unstable and likely to continue to decline. These vines have one harvests per year (November to January) with a production of about 300,000 fruit per hectare. If the price at the time of harvest, one kilo (approximately 25 pieces) only Rp. 500,- up to Rp. 800,- so that farmers only received Rp 6.0 million to Rp 9.6 million per hectare. This situation drives the passion fruit planting area continued to decline. In 1996 there were 1,241 hectares with a production of 21,861 tonnes. Four years later planting area into 854 hectares with a production of 7,189 tons. Many farmers to switch crops from passion fruit to vegetables for more

Sights and tourism
One of the most important sights is Fortress Samba Opu (Benteng Samba Opu) in the town of Sunggumninasa. A part of the walls including a round tower are just being restored. The strongest wall with a thickness of seven metres was built in the west towards the sea as Sultan Hasanuddin feared an attack from this direction. Weapons, coins, traditional clothings etc. are on display in a museum in the middle of the fortress. Various houses in the traditional styles of eleven different peoples of southern Sulawesi were built in the fortress.

Parangloe Tiered Waterfall
Parangloe Tiered Waterfall is located in Parangloe district, 42 kilometers east of Makassar with severely damaged road and then 1.5 kilometers in a half hour walk.

References

Regencies of South Sulawesi